Muya Wayin (Quechua muya garden, Ancash Quechua wayi house, "garden house", -n a suffix, also spelled Moyahuain) is a mountain in the eastern extensions of the Wallanka mountain range in the Andes of Peru which reaches a height of approximately . It is located in the Ancash Region, Bolognesi Province, Huallanca District. Muya Wayin lies on a ridge east of Wallanka, west of Yana Pukyu (Quechua for "black spring").

References 

Mountains of Peru
Mountains of Ancash Region